Turmoil is a simulation video game by Gamious released on June 2, 2016. It is available on Steam.

Gameplay 

Turmoil is inspired by the 19th century oil rush in North America. The player has to earn their way to become a successful oil entrepreneur. As the player make money digging up and selling oil, the town will grow along with them, allowing the player to buy upgrades, such as more horses or bigger pipes. Campaign mode allows the player to buy land at an auction, and dig for oil using dowsers, moles, or scanners, earning as much as they can in one year. The player goes up against three rival AIs in each level.

Development 
Turmoil was in a prototype phase for a year before it entered Steam Early Access in June 2015. After spending another year in early access, Turmoil was released on Steam in June 2016. In February 2017, Turmoil was also released on iOS for iPad.

Reception 

The game was received as being an extremely simple game, but had too much repetition. It was also cited as "the epitome of simplicity" and "an addictive and nostalgic management strategy".

References 

2016 video games
Early access video games
IOS games
Linux games
MacOS games
Single-player video games
Simulation video games
Video games developed in the Netherlands
Windows games